Alex Smith (born 1984) is an American football quarterback.

Alex Smith may also refer to:

Association football
Alex Smith (footballer, born 1876) (1876–1954), Scottish international footballer (Rangers)
Alex Smith (footballer, born 1915) (1915–?), Scottish footballer (Liverpool)
Alex Smith (footballer, born 1938), English football goalkeeper (Halifax Town)
Alex Smith (footballer, born 1939), Scottish footballer and manager (St. Mirren, Aberdeen, Dundee United)
Alex Smith (footballer, born 1940), Scottish footballer (Dunfermline Athletic, Rangers)
Alex Smith (footballer, born 1944), English footballer (Middlesbrough)
Alex Smith (footballer, born 1947), English footballer (Bradford City, Southend United)
Alex Smith (New Zealand footballer), New Zealand international footballer
Alex Smith (footballer, born 1976), English footballer (Port Vale, Wrexham)
Alex Smith (footballer, born 1985), English footballer (FC Dallas, Sydney Olympic, Wellington Phoenix)
Alex Smith (footballer, born 1991), English footballer (Yeovil Town)

Other sports
Alex Smith (golfer) (1874–1930), member of a famous Scottish golfing family
Alex Smith (ice hockey) (1902–1963), Canadian NHL hockey player
Alex Smith (tight end) (born 1982), American football tight end
Alex Smith (hammer thrower) (born 1988), British hammer thrower

Others
Alex Smith (c. 1862–1922), African-American man who was lynched by a white mob in Gulfport, Mississippi, in 1922; see Lynching of Alex Smith
Alex Smith (builder) (1899–1973), Australian heritage designer-builder on the Redcliffe Peninsula
Alex Smith (engineer) (1922–2003), Scottish industrial scientist and educator
Alex Smith (politician) (born 1943), Labour MEP for South of Scotland
Alex T. Smith (born 1985), British author and illustrator of children's books
Alex Smith (businessman) (born 1986), American businessman
Alex Smith, member of British comedy trio Hat Films

See also
Alec Smith (disambiguation)
Alexander Smith (disambiguation)
Alex Smit (born 1985), Dutch baseball player
Alix Smith (born 1978), American photographer